Ostrakine (Greek:  or Latin: Ostracena) was an ancient Egyptian city at a location that is known as El Felusiyat today.

Location
Ostrakine was located on the road between Alexandria and Gaza at Lake Bardawil, a saltwater lagoon near the Mediterranean coast of the northern Sinai.

History
Established as a harbour in the first century BC, near Sirbonis, the longtime border between Egypt and Syria,  archaeological evidence suggests that Ostrakine was a centre of glass-making in the classical period.  A bishopric during the Byzantine period, there is evidence of three Byzantine churches, and that the town remained important as a stop along the trade route in the early Muslim period.

Tradition
Ostrakine has traditionally been thought to be the site of the tomb of the prophet Habakkuk and the martyrdom of James the Less

Madaba Map
Ostrakine is depicted on the Madaba Map

See also
 List of ancient Egyptian towns and cities

Notes

Cities in ancient Egypt